Emilio Muñoz Barrero (born 16 January 1979), simply known as Emilio, is a Spanish footballer who plays for Real Jaén as a goalkeeper.

Club career
Born in Úbeda, Jaén, Andalusia, Emilio made his senior debut with hometown club Úbeda CF in 1997. In 1999, after a brief stint at Deportivo Alavés B, he moved to Segunda División B club Real Jaén.

After achieving promotion in 2000, Emilio made his professional debut on 20 May 2001, starting in a 2–2 away draw against Levante UD. He remained as a backup in the following years, and left the club in January 2004.

Emilio subsequently joined Villajoyosa CF in the third division, and continued to appear in the same category but also in Tercera División in the following years, representing Benidorm CF, CD Atlético Baleares, CF La Nucía and Atlético Mancha Real.

References

External links
Atlético Mancha Real profile 

1979 births
Living people
People from Úbeda
Sportspeople from the Province of Jaén (Spain)
Spanish footballers
Footballers from Andalusia
Association football goalkeepers
Segunda División players
Segunda División B players
Tercera División players
Deportivo Alavés B players
Real Jaén footballers
Villajoyosa CF footballers
Benidorm CF footballers
CD Atlético Baleares footballers